Madera station is an unstaffed train station near Madera, California, United States that is served by San Joaquins trains, which run between Oakland or Sacramento and Bakersfield, California.

Description 
It is easily accessible from Highway 99 (Golden State Highway) by taking the Cleveland Avenue interchange (Exit 155) and then heading east as Cleveland Avenue quickly curves to the north and becomes Country Club Drive. Continue north on Country Club Drive, which eventually becomes Road 26, until the station is reached (at what would be about Avenue 18¾). The Madera Golf and Country Club is located just northwest of the station.

The station has a payphone, Quik-Trak automated ticket kiosk, restrooms, and two shelters, but no indoor waiting area. An unattended 32 space parking lot is available at the station, with two spaces reserved for persons with disabilities and two reserved for electric vehicle charging. The station has one side platform which serves the single track.

Of the 78 California stations regularly served by Amtrak, Madera was the 51st-busiest in Fiscal Year 2013, boarding or detraining an average of approximately 75 passengers daily.

History 

That "station" consisted of not much more than a sign along the tracks indicating where the train would stop if it was flagged. When Amtrak took over nearly all passenger rail service in the United States in 1971, there was no longer any passenger service to the area. Amtrak resumed passenger rail served to Storey station (which Amtrak called Madera) with the San Joaquins on October 30, 1977. Although Amtrak substantially improved the conditions at Storey station, after about dozen years of service, official discussion began regarding improving the station. As the project plans developed over the next decade, the option of an entirely new station was selected over improvements to the existing one.

In August 2010, ground was broken on this new station. The grand opening of the new Amtrak station took place on November 4, 2010, with regular service beginning the 8th. The $2 million station project, which included a new platform, shelter, lighting, access road and landscaping, involved the city of Madera, Amtrak, BNSF Railway and Caltrans. Funding came from Madera County's “Measure T,” a ½ cent transportation improvement sales tax, the state of California and the California Transportation Commission. Over the next three years, the new station saw a nearly 25% increase in ridership and received additional improvements to the station, including solar panels. Nearly all evidence of the former Madera (Storey) station has been entirely removed.

Since the new station opened, service by the San Joaquin had increased substantially from the once daily runs in each direction. By 2010 the San Joaquin ran twice daily (in each direction) between Sacramento and Bakersfield and four times daily (in each direction) between Oakland and Bakersfield.

Future 

The April 2016 revisions to California High-Speed Rail's business plan proposed a relocated Madera station. The station is intended to be a transfer point to San Joaquin trains, as this will be the only Phase I station in the Central Valley where both services are co-located. The addition was partially the result of comments from the public review period.  Several Madera County officials praised the addition of the high-speed rail stop.

Funding for the new station was provided as part of the Valley Rail project in 2018. Work on station relocation is ongoing , as the San Joaquin Joint Powers Authority has entered into negotiations with CAHSR, Madera County, and the city of Madera.  the new station at Avenue 12 is expected to open in 2023.

References

External links 

Madera Amtrak Station — USA Rail Guide (TrainWeb)

Railway stations in Madera County, California
Amtrak stations in California
Madera, California
Railway stations in the United States opened in 2010
2010 establishments in California